Raymond or Ray Patterson may refer to:

Muhammad Ali (drummer) (born 1936), American jazz drummer, originally named Raymond Patterson
Ray Patterson (animator) (1911–2001), American animator, producer, and director
Ray Patterson (basketball) (1922–2011), American basketball player and general manager
Raymond M. Patterson (1898–1984), English writer and explorer
Raymond R. Patterson (1929–2001), African-American poet

See also
Lyman Ray Patterson (1929–2003), American copyright scholar
Patterson (disambiguation)